Charles H. Carpenter (March 11, 1898 – June 22, 1975) was an American football player.  He played college football for the Wisconsin Badgers football team of the University of Wisconsin and was captain of the 1919 Wisconsin Badgers football team.  He was recognized as a consensus first-team All-American at the center position in 1919.  While attending Wisconsin, Carpenter was also a member of Alpha Delta Phi, Iron Cross, White Spades, Skull and Crescent, Star and Arrow, and Student Council of Defense, and president of the Athletic Board.

In 1920, Carpenter became an assistant football coach at Stanford.

References

1898 births
1960 deaths
American football centers
Wisconsin Badgers football players
All-American college football players
People from Hartland, Wisconsin
Players of American football from Wisconsin